Macaire le Copte is a novel by François Weyergans. It was first published in Paris in 1981 by Gallimard. This book won the Prix Victor-Rossel in 1981 and the Prix des Deux Magots in 1982. The story is set in fourth century Egypt.

Editions 
 Macaire le Copte, éditions Gallimard, 1981 .

References
French XX Bibliography, issue 38, volume 8, p 8726
Pascal Ruffenach, "Des bords du désert jusqu'à son centre" (1981) Quinzaine littéraire, issue 358, p 9 Google Books
Bulletin critique du livre français, 1982 issues 433-438, page 117426 Google Books
Francois Nourissier, "Weyergans, une nouvelle métamorphose" (1981) Le Figaro Magazine, issue 139, p 52 Google Books
(1982) 56 World Literature Today 646 Google Books

1981 Belgian novels
French-language novels